Vítkovice may refer to several places in the Czech Republic:

Vítkovice (Semily District), village in Semily District
Vítkovice (Ostrava), district of the city of Ostrava
FC Vítkovice, a football club from Vítkovice, Ostrava
HC Vítkovice Steel, an ice hockey club based in Ostrava
Vítkovice (Klatovy), district of the city of Klatovy

See also
Vítkov (disambiguation)
Witkowski